This is a list of Dungeons & Dragons fiction in the form of novels and short stories. Dungeons & Dragons has multiple official fictional settings and with it many novels and other fiction releases for each of these settings.

1970s and 1980s

1990s

2000s

2010s

2020s

See also 
Fictional work organized by campaign setting:

 Dark Sun
 Dragonlance
 Eberron
 Forgotten Realms
 Ravenloft

Notes

Footnotes

References
 

Dungeons and Dragons